Bienek is a surname. Notable people with the surname include:

Horst Bienek (1930–1990), German novelist and poet
Lewis Bienek (born 1998), English rugby league footballer